Anchirithra is a genus of moths in the family Lasiocampidae. The genus was erected by Arthur Gardiner Butler in 1878.

Species
Anchirithra insignis Butler, 1878
Anchirithra pallescens
Anchirithra punctuligera Mabille, 1879
Anchirithra viettei de Lajonquière, 1970

References

Lasiocampidae
Moth genera